Dimitri Illarionov (born 1979) is a Russian classical guitarist. He is a winner of the Guitar Foundation of America Competition (2002, Miami, USA) and Francisco Tárrega Guitar Competition (2008, Spain).

Music career

Education

Dimitri studied in Russia at the Russian Gnesins's Academy of Music.

Competitions
Illarionov is the winner and laureate of numerous international competitions.

Performances
Illarionov has an active concert life, playing solo recitals and performing as soloist with orchestras.

Works
Illarionov's repertoire is broad and versatile. It ranges across various periods and styles: music of the Renaissance and Baroque (Luis Milan, Alonso Mudarra, John Dowland, J. S. Bach), original music for guitar from the 19th and early 20th centuries (Fernando Sor, Mauro Giuliani, Francisco Tárrega), and music of the 20th and 21st centuries (Frank Martin, Alexandre Tansman, Manuel Ponce, Joaquín Rodrigo, Joaquín Turina, Agustín Barrios, Mario Castelnuovo-Tedesco, William Walton, Sérgio Assad, Roland Dyens, Dusan Bogdanovic, Angelo Gilardino, the unique cycle 24 Preludes and Fugues for Solo Guitar by Igor Rekhin), as well as compositions for guitar with orchestra and chamber music.

Dimitri Illarionov has recorded the CD Premieres with the Moscow Chamber "The Seasons" Orchestra (conductor – Vladislav Bulakhov) for Les Éditions Doberman-Yppan; two solo CDs: by Naxos Records (Laureate Series) and the CD East Side Story (Daminus Records) with music written by modern Eastern European composers. Illarionov's Classical Duo CD (Delos Records) with Russian cellist Boris Andrianov entered the long-list of the 2004 Grammy Awards.

See also

International classical guitar competitions

References

External links
 Dmitry Illarionov's web site
 Dmitry Illarionov's blog

Russian classical guitarists
Russian male guitarists
1979 births
Living people
21st-century guitarists
21st-century Russian male musicians